Liptovská Osada is a village and municipality in Ružomberok District in the Žilina Region of northern Slovakia.

History
In historical records the village was first mentioned in 1649.

Geography
The municipality lies at an altitude of 609 metres and covers an area of 50.195 km². It has a population of about 1617 people.

Churches in village 

 Roman Catholic Church of st. John Baptist
 Church of Czechoslovak Hussite Church

References

External links

https://web.archive.org/web/20080111223415/http://www.statistics.sk/mosmis/eng/run.html

Villages and municipalities in Ružomberok District